Sameera Saneesh (born 27 June 1983) is an Indian costume-cum-fashion designer from Kerala, known for her extensive work in Malayalam-language films. She is a recipient of two Kerala State Film Awards for Best Costume Designer (2014 and 2018). As of March, 2019, she has been part of around 150 feature films. She is often described by the media as "busiest costume designer in Malayalam film industry".

Sameera holds a diploma in fashion designing from National Institute for Fashion Designing, Cochin. She started her professional career as an in-house designer for Raymond. She had already started freelancing costumes for ad films while studying in Cochin. She started with television ads for Soundarya Silks. Her ad for the Seemas brand, shot in Mysore Palace, was widely appreciated. She went on to design costumes for the television commercials for Bhima, Alukkas, Kalyan Silks, Dhatri, Nirapara and the VKC. Some of these television ads featured major film actors of south India, such as Nithya Menon and Prithviraj Sukumaran.

Sameera's first film as costume designer was The White Elephant, a 2008 low-profile Hindi film, directed by Aijaz Khan. Her first major commercial film, Aashiq Abu's Daddy Cool, was released in 2009. Sameera currently holds to her credit an award by Limca Book of Records for "designing costumes for a large number of films in a very short span of time". She has a supporting team of around 25 people designing and creating clothes for the film characters.

Sameera was born to Ibrahim and Jameela in June, 1983. She completed her undergraduate degree at Bharat Mata College, Cochin. It was her fondness for drawing and fabric painting that saw her join for a diploma in fashion designing. She is married to Saneesh K. J., a Kochi-based engineer. She has cited her late mother Jameela as major influence on her life and career. Sabyasachi Mukherjee, a famous fashion designer from Kolkata, is the "favorite designer" of Sameera Saneesh.

Filmography

References

External links
Official Facebook page of Sameera Saneesh

Indian women fashion designers
Costume designers of Malayalam cinema
Kerala State Film Award winners
Living people
1983 births
Indian costume designers
21st-century Indian designers
21st-century Indian women artists
Women costume designers